Harun-or-Rashid is a Bangladeshi police officer and Chief of Detective Branch (DB) of Dhaka Metropolitan Police (DMP). He is known for his controversial actions.

Early life 
Harun-or-Rashid is from Kishoreganj District.

Career 
Harun-or-Rashid, Deputy Commissioner of Lalbagh Division of Dhaka Metropolitan Police, assaulted Zainul Abedin Farroque, Bangladesh Nationalist Party's member of parliament and Chief Opposition Whip, during an anti-government protest. A. B. M. Ashraf Uddin, member of parliament, filed attempted murder case of Zainul Abedin Farroque against 25 police officers including Harun-or-Rashid and ASP Biplob Kumar Sarker. Mohammad Hasibul Haque, Dhaka Metropolitan Magistrate, rejected the case against the police officers on 4 September 2012.

On 9 December 2012, Harun-or-Rashid was present at the Murder of Biswajit Das but did not intervene.

In February 2013, Harun-or-Rashid was awarded a medal by Bangladesh Police which The Daily Star described sarcastically as an award for beating up an opposition member of parliament.

Harun-or-Rashid was elected Secretary General of Bangladesh Police Service Association in January 2016 while Asaduzzaman Mia was president of the association. On 5 May 2016, Sub Inspector Azharul Islam demanded 50 million taka from Amber Denim, part of Amber Group which Showkat Aziz Russell owned, and threatened to destroy his business on behalf of his senior officer Harun-or-Rashid. Showkat Aziz Russell sent letters to various branches of the government and trade bodies seeking protection from Harun-or-Rashid, then Superintendent of Police of Gazipur District. Harun-or-Rashid provided an address in the United States where he demanded the money be sent. Journalists in Gazipur District reported being harassed by personnel of Detective Branch for reporting on extortion activities of Harun-or-Rashid. He was briefly transferred following allegations by the Bangladesh Nationalist Party that he was supporting government candidates during local elections.

On 2 December 2018, Harun-or-Rashid was appointed Superintendent of Police of Narayangaj District before the general election after the previous Superintendent of police Anisur Rahman was transferred onn the request of the Bangladesh Nationalist Party as his wife Fatema Tuzzahura was a member of parliament of the Awami League. Bangladesh Nationalist Party used the expression "Out of the frying pan into the fire" to describe the situation following the transfer.

In August 2019, Harun-or-Rashid, received a medal from the Bangladesh Police Dhaka range.

Harun-or-Rashid claimed Detective Branch unit of Narayanganj District arrested the wife and minor son of Showkat Aziz Russell, son of the founder of Partex Group M. A. Hashem, allegedly recovered drugs, bullets, and liquor from their car in Narayanganj on 2 November 2019. His account did not held up at CCTV footage from the residence of Showkat Aziz Russell in Gulshan, Dhaka showed his family members being detained at his residence without informing the Gulshan Police Station per the law. On 3 November 2019, Harun-or-Rashid was transferred from the post of Superintendent of Police of Narayangaj District to Training and Reserve unit at the police headquarters while facing a number of criminal allegations. The transfer order was signed by Dhananjay Kumar Das, the Deputy Secretary at the Ministry of Home Affairs. Showkat Aziz Russell secured bail from the Bangladesh High Court on 4 November 2019 and alleged Harun-or-Rashid tried to extort money from him. M. A. Hashem claimed Harun-or-Rashid tried to extort 80 million taka from his son Showkat Aziz Russell and filed cases over drugs because of his refusal to pay. Asaduzzaman Khan Kamal, Minister of Home Affairs who had refused to talk to Harun at a public function, assured the media of an investigation against Harun-or-Rashid in presence of AKM Mozammel Haq, head of the cabinet committee on law and order. On 13 November 2019, Harun-or-Rashid and his fellow police officers assaulted the referee of a friendly football match. He was the Secretary General of Bangladesh Police Service Association.

Harun-or-Rashid was appointed Deputy Commissioner of Dhaka Metropolitan Police on 3 November 2019.

On 2 May 2021, Harun-or-Rashid was promoted to additional deputy inspector general.

A video of Harun-or-Rashid in which he slapped a police constable went viral on social media in April 2022. He was promoted to deputy inspector general on 13 May 2022 just after 1 year of being promoted to Additional DIG. He was appointed chief of the Detective Branch of DMP on 13 July 2022 from additional commissioner of the Detective Branch.

References 

Living people
Bangladeshi police officers
People from Kishoreganj District
Year of birth missing (living people)